Pukinmäki railway station is a railway station in the Pukinmäki district of Helsinki, Finland. It is located between the stations of Oulunkylä and Malmi, along the main railroad track from Helsinki to Riihimäki, on top of Kehä I.

Departure tracks
North
 Track 3: Trains I, K, and T

To Helsinki Central
 Track 4: Trains P, K, and T

References

Railway stations in Helsinki